Israeli passage through the Suez Canal and Straits of Tiran is the freedom of navigation for Israeli vessels through the Egyptian-controlled Suez Canal and Straits of Tiran.

Egypt controlled the Suez Canal and Straits of Tiran, and did not recognize Israel after the two countries signed an armistice agreement to end the 1947–1949 Palestine war. Egypt began to strengthen a blockade of Israeli shipping as relations between Israel and Egypt deteriorated further between 1949 and 1956. They were opened partially following the 1956 Suez Crisis, wherein Israel invaded Egypt with the explicit intention of ensuring access to these waters. This reoccurred after further deterioration of the relationship between the two countries in the mid-1960s; Egypt renewed the blockade in 1967, leading to the Six Day War.  The current status is set by the Egypt–Israel peace treaty of 1979. 

The Straits of Tiran route served Israel's only port on the Gulf of Aqaba, Eilat. However, this had limited economic relevance prior to 1956 – construction of the Port of Eilat was only begun in 1952, and was only able to take oceangoing vessels from March 1956. Prior to this point, an average of only two vessels per year travelled to Eilat.

History

1948–1951
At the start of the Arab–Israeli conflict in May 1948, Egypt blocked passage through the Suez Canal to Israeli-registered ships and to ships (Israeli or otherwise) carrying cargo to and from all Israeli ports. Since all land trade routes were blocked by other Arab states, Israel's ability to trade with East Africa and Asia, mainly to import oil from the Persian Gulf, was severely hampered. The Straits of Tiran and Suez Canal remained formally closed to Israeli vessels from the creation of Israel in 1948 until the Suez Crisis in 1956.

On 10 March 1949, Israeli forces took control of the area around the coastal village of Umm al-Rashrash, later renamed Eilat, as part of Operation Uvda, giving Israel access to the Gulf of Aqaba, which leads to the Straits of Tiran. The capture of Umm Rashrash, and thus Israeli access to the Gulf of Aqaba, was not subject to the Egyptian–Israeli armistice agreement, because that agreement had been signed three weeks prior on 24 February 1949. In December 1949 Egypt started to erect military installations on the uninhabited islands of Tiran and Sanafir and the Sinai coast opposite the islands to control the straits. The Egyptian Government communicated its accord with Saudi Arabia to the UK and the US on 30 January and 28 February 1950 respectively:

Israel first complained to the United Nations about Egyptian interference with shipping in June 1951; at this time the complaints were solely about the Suez Canal, as the Straits of Tiran were not relevant (the Port of Eilat did not open until 1952, and even then only to small boats). Israel also prepared military plans to force Egypt to let their ships pass, should diplomatic means were to be unsuccessful. On 1 September 1951, the United Nations Security Council Resolution 95 was passed; it called upon Egypt to "terminate the restrictions on the passage of international commercial shipping and goods through the Suez Canal wherever bound". Although the resolution referred only to the Suez, Israel believed it would induce a change in Egyptian policy on the Straits of Tiran.

During this period the Straits had limited relevance to Israel's economy; between 1949 and 1956, only ten ships destined for Eilat passed through the Straits of Tiran, all of them having a foreign maritime flag.

1952–1955
On 25 June 1952, the Eilat was declared to have a port – albeit one with very basic facilities; a fully functioning port would be developed over the coming years.

Between 1949 and late 1953, Egypt allowed non-strategic goods to pass unhindered to Israel.

On 10 July 1955, Ben-Gurion announced that the port of Eilat was nearly complete; it would be completed by mid-1956. Egyptian intervention was increased further in 1955, after the killing of 38 Egyptian soldiers on 28 February 1955 in Operation Black Arrow and the killing of 72 Egyptian soldiers on 31 August 1955 in Operation Elkayam. In response to the latter event, on 5 September 1955, Egypt tightened its blockade of Israeli shipping through the Straits of Tiran, as well as closed the airspace above it. In response, the Israel's Ministry of Foreign Affairs stated on 13 September 1955 that "Israel is determined to protect the rights of free passage through this international channel at whatever time and by whatever methods it sees fit"; and on 29 September 1955, two days after delivery of this statement, David Ben-Gurion, then Israel's Minister of Defence declared that should the blockade remain in effect, Israel would not hesitate to use force.

1956: Suez Crisis

In the period prior to what became known as the Suez Crisis, on 13 October 1956 United Nations Security Council Resolution 118 was released, stating that "There should be free and open transit through the Canal without discrimination, overt or covert – this covers both political and technical aspects".

1957–1966
Egypt was required by the international community to open the waterways to all shipping following the conflict, although it never acceded to doing so with respect to Israeli shipping, due formally to its non-recognition of the country.
 
Following the Suez Crisis, Israel made a number of statements confirming the importance of shipping access – these statements were used as political justification a decade later on the outbreak of the 1967 war. On 1 March 1957, Israel's Foreign Minister Golda Meir declared at the UN General Assembly that any closure of the Straits of Tiran would be considered by Israel as an act of war, or justification for war:

However, in a less widely publicised statement ten days later on 11 March 1957, Nasser announced that he would not permit passage of Israeli ships either through the Gulf of Aqaba or the Suez Canal. However, both Egypt and Israel subsequently and unofficially pulled back from their formal positions.

In practice, these restrictions had limited economic relevance; during the ten year period from 1957 to 1967, only one Israeli-flagged ship per month and four foreign-flagged ships per month arrived at Eilat. Although by the end of the decade, Israeli oil shipments from Pahlavi Iran became important, Israel could have replaced this with cheaper Venezuelan oil via the Mediterranean.

1967: Six Day War
In 1967, as tensions rose between Egypt and Israel, Israel reiterated declarations made in 1957 that any closure of the Straits would be considered an act of war.

Nasser declared the Straits closed to Israeli shipping on May 22–23.

Israeli Prime Minister Eshkol repeated declarations that Israel had made in 1957, saying that closure of the Straits of Tiran would be an act of war.  Then, on May 22, Egypt responded by announcing, in addition to the UN withdrawal, that the Straits of Tiran would be closed to "all ships flying Israeli flags or carrying strategic materials", with effect from May 23. In order to enforce the blockade, Egypt falsely announced that the Tiran straits had been mined. 90% of Israeli oil passed through the Straits of Tiran. Oil tankers that were due to pass through the straits were delayed.

According to Sami Sharaf, Minister of State for Presidential Affairs, Nasser knew that the decision to block the Tiran straits made the war "inevitable".  Nasser stated, "Under no circumstances can we permit the Israeli flag to pass through the Gulf of Aqaba."  The closure of the Tiran Straits was closely linked to the previous withdrawal of the UN peacekeepers, because having the peacekeepers (rather than the Egyptian military) at Sharm El Sheikh was important for keeping that waterway open.

In his speech to Arab trade unionists on May 26, Nasser announced: "If Israel embarks on an aggression against Syria or Egypt, the battle against Israel will be a general one and not confined to one spot on the Syrian or Egyptian borders. The battle will be a general one and our basic objective will be to destroy Israel."

Nasser publicly denied that Egypt would strike first and spoke of a negotiated peace if Israel allowed all Palestinian refugees the right of return, and of a possible compromise over the Straits of Tiran.

As a result of the Six Day war, the waterways were again reopened to Israeli shipping.

Legal considerations

For the Egyptian right to close the Straits 
Egypt stated that the Gulf of Aqaba had always been a national inland waterway subject to the sovereignty of the only three (in their minds) legitimate littoral States — Jordan, Saudi Arabia, and Egypt — who had the right to bar enemy vessels. The representative of the United Arab Republic further stated that "Israel's claim to have a port on the Gulf was considered invalid, as Israel was alleged to have occupied several miles of coastline on the Gulfline, including Umm Rashrash, in violation of Security Council resolutions of 1948 and the Egyptian–Israel General Armistice Agreement."

The Arab states disputed Israel's right of passage through the Straits, noting they had not signed the Convention on the Territorial Sea and Contiguous Zone specifically because of article 16(4) which provided Israel with that right.

In the United Nations General Assembly debates after the war, the Arab states and their supporters argued that even if international law gave Israel the right of passage, Israel was not entitled to attack Egypt to assert that right, because the closure was not an "armed attack" as defined by Article 51 of the United Nations Charter. 
Supporting this view in a letter written to the New York Times in June 1967, lawyer Roger Fisher argued that
The United Arab Republic had a good legal case for restricting traffic through the Strait of Tiran. First it is debatable whether international law confers any right of innocent passage through such a waterway.... [Secondly]... a right of innocent passage is not a right of free passage for any cargo at any time. In the words of the Convention on the Territorial Sea: 'Passage is innocent so long as it is not prejudicial to the peace, good order, or security of the coastal state... taking the facts as they were I, as an international lawyer, would rather defend before the International Court of Justice the legality of the U.A.R's action in closing the Strait of Tiran than to argue the other side of the case...

Against the Egyptian right to close the Straits 
After the 1956 campaign in which Israel conquered Sharm el-Sheikh and opened the blocked Straits, it was forced to withdraw and return the territory to Egypt. At the time, members of the international community pledged that Israel would never again be denied use of the Straits of Tiran. The French representative to the UN, for example, announced that an attempt to interfere with free shipping in the Straits would be against international law, and American President Dwight Eisenhower went so far as publicly to recognize that reimposing a blockade in the Straits of Tiran would be seen as an aggressive act which would oblige Israel to protect its maritime rights in accordance with Article 51 of the UN Charter.

The rights of Egypt regarding the Straits of Tiran had been debated at the General Assembly pursuant to Israel's withdrawal from the Sinai following the Suez Crisis. A number of states, including Australia, Canada, Denmark, the Netherlands, New Zealand, the United Kingdom and the United States argued that the Straits were international waters, and, as such, all vessels had the right of "free and innocent passage" through them. India, however, argued that Egypt was entitled to require foreign ships to obtain its consent before seeking access to the gulf because its territorial sea covered the Straits of Tiran. It too recognized the right of innocent passage through such waters, but argued it was up to the coastal State to decide which passage was "innocent".

Israel's political ‘anchor’ in its efforts to prevent any disruption of freedom of shipping through the Straits was a statement by then Foreign Minister Golda Meir at the UN Assembly on 1 March 1957, while announcing her government's decision to respond to the demand for withdrawal from Sinai and the Gaza Strip, to the effect that Israel would view disruption of free shipping through the Tiran Straits as an act of aggression and would reserve the right to react in accordance with Clause 51 of the UN Charter.

International law professor John Quigley argues that under the doctrine of proportionality, Israel would only be entitled to use such force as would be necessary to secure its right of passage.

State practice and customary international law is that ships of all states have a right of innocent passage through territorial seas. That Egypt had consistently granted passage as a matter of state practice until then suggests that its opinio juris in that regard was consistent with practice. Moreover, during the Egyptian occupation of the Saudi islands of Sanafir and Tiran in 1950, it provided assurances to the US that the military occupation would not be used to prevent free passage, and that Egypt recognizes that such free passage is "in conformity with the international practice and the recognized principles of international law.". In 1949 the International Court of Justice held in the Corfu Channel Case (United Kingdom v. Albania) that where a strait was overlapped by a territorial sea foreign ships, including warships, had unsuspendable right of innocent passage through such straits used for international navigation between parts of the high seas, but express provision for innocent passage through straits within the territorial sea of a foreign state was not codified until the 1958 Convention on the Territorial Sea and the Contiguous Zone.

See also
Closure of the Suez Canal (1967–1975)

Notes

References

Bibliography
 
 Salaheddine Dabbagh, السيادة العربية على خليج العقبة ومضيق تيران دراسة قانونية (Arab Sovereignty over the Gulf of Aqaba and the Straits of Tiran), 1967
 Reyner, Anthony S. “The Strait of Tirān and the Sovereignty of the Sea.” Middle East Journal, vol. 21, no. 3, 1967, pp. 403–08, http://www.jstor.org/stable/4324168. Accessed 28 Apr. 2022.
 
 
 Leo Gross, “Passage through the Strait of Tiran and in the Gulf of Aqaba.” Law and Contemporary Problems, vol. 33, no. 1, 1968, pp. 125–46, https://doi.org/10.2307/1190846. Accessed 28 Apr. 2022.
 Richard Reeve Baxter, The Law of War in the Arab–Israeli Conflict: On Water and On Land

Arab–Israeli conflict